Pieve di Sant'Andrea may refer to the following churches in Italy:

Pieve di Sant'Andrea (Cercina)
Pieve di Sant'Andrea (Pistoia)
Pieve di Sant'Andrea, Sarzana

See also
 Pieve (disambiguation)